Sir David John White  (born 2 February 1940), known professionally by his stage name David Jason, is an English actor. He is best known for his roles as Derek "Del Boy" Trotter in the BBC sitcom Only Fools and Horses, Detective Inspector Jack Frost in A Touch of Frost, Granville in Open All Hours and Still Open All Hours, and Pop Larkin in The Darling Buds of May, as well as voicing Mr. Toad in The Wind in the Willows, the BFG in the 1989 film, and the title characters of Danger Mouse and Count Duckula. His most recent appearance in the role of Del Boy was in 2014; he retired his role as Frost in 2010.

In September 2006, Jason topped the poll to find TV's 50 Greatest Stars, as part of ITV's 50th anniversary celebrations. He was knighted in 2005 for services to acting and comedy. Jason has won four British Academy Television Awards (BAFTAs), (1988, 1991, 1997, 2003), four British Comedy Awards (1990, 1992, 1997, 2001) and seven National Television Awards (1996 twice, 1997, 2001 twice, 2002 and 2011).

Early life
Jason's father, Arthur Robert White, was a porter at Billingsgate Fish Market, and his mother, Olwen Jones, was from Merthyr Tydfil, Glamorgan, Wales, and worked as a charwoman. She gave birth to twin boys at North Middlesex Hospital in Edmonton, London, in February 1940, but Jason's twin brother died during childbirth, making him a twinless twin. He chose the stage name Jason because he liked Jason and the Argonauts, as the stage name "David White" was already taken, and not in tribute to his dead twin as has sometimes been claimed.

Jason lived at Lodge Lane, North Finchley, and attended Northfield Secondary Modern school after failing the 11-plus in 1951. Upon leaving school, Jason wanted to be an actor, influenced by his brother, but their father advised that he first learn a trade. He trained as an electrician for six years, before retiring and becoming a struggling actor.

Jason's elder brother is the actor Arthur White, born in 1933. The two appeared together in the crime drama A Touch of Frost, with Arthur playing police archivist Ernie Trigg; and again in 2008, in the comic fantasy The Colour of Magic, where Arthur played a character called "Rerpf". He also appeared briefly with his brother in two episodes of The Darling Buds of May.

When Jason was 15 he spent a year working as a mechanic's assistant.  When he turned 16 he was eligible to register for an apprenticeship, but decided against it.

Radio and TV career

Early years
Jason started his television career in 1964 playing the part of Bert Bradshaw in Crossroads. In 1967, he played spoof super-hero Captain Fantastic, among other roles, in the children's comedy series Do Not Adjust Your Set (Rediffusion London/ITV) with Eric Idle, Terry Jones, Denise Coffey, and Michael Palin. Humphrey Barclay, who recruited Jason to appear in Do Not Adjust Your Set (partly to counter the more highbrow style of Idle, Jones, and Palin), admired his sense of timing. The programme ended in 1969, and the character then appeared for a time in the Thames Television children's programme Magpie. Jason appeared in the BBC comedy series Hugh and I in 1967, which starred Hugh Lloyd and Terry Scott as two friends who lived together in South London. He appeared in the Randall and Hopkirk (Deceased) episode "That's How Murder Snowballs" (1969) as Abel, a framed performer in a major London theatre.

In 1968, Jason was initially cast in the role of Lance Corporal Jones in the Jimmy Perry and David Croft BBC comedy Dad's Army. Croft had been very impressed with the actor and knew that he had the talent to play a man much older than his real age. However, BBC executive Bill Cotton overruled him, casting Clive Dunn because he was better known. According to Jason, "I was cast at 12 o'clock and sacked by three." Jason also subsequently missed out on the starring role of Frank Spencer in Some Mothers Do 'Ave 'Em in 1973 because BBC executives at the time believed that he lacked "star quality".

In the 1970s, he also acted in radio comedies, including the weekly topical satire Week Ending (in which he regularly played such figures as then UK Foreign Secretary Dr David Owen) and The Hitchhiker's Guide to the Galaxy (as the "B Ark Captain" in the sixth episode). Jason also appeared in The Next Programme Follows Almost Immediately and made appearances on panel games such as The Impressionists as well as his own series, The Jason Explanation. In the early 1970s, he appeared in Mostly Monkhouse.

Jason appeared on stage in the West End in the farce No Sex Please, We're British playing Brian Runnicles for 18 months in 1973. He also starred with Valerie Leon in a stage comedy "Darling Mr London" which toured in 1975.

Jason appeared in variety shows as the supporting act of Dick Emery and his performances caught the attention of Ronnie Barker. Jason was recruited to appear in Hark at Barker (LWT, 1969), starring opposite Barker's Lord Rustless, as Dithers, the 100-year old gardener. There was also a sequel, His Lordship Entertains (1972) for the BBC.  Jason played idealistic employee Granville in the first programme of the comedy anthology Seven of One (1973), called Open All Hours (BBC) and starring Barker as the curmudgeonly proprietor of a corner shop.

Four series of Open All Hours were made from 1976 to 1985. He featured in Barker's Porridge (BBC), a prison comedy, as the elderly Blanco in three episodes. Jason also appeared with Barker in various disguises in The Two Ronnies, including providing the "raspberry" sound effect for The Phantom Raspberry Blower of Old London Town.

Jason starred in London Weekend Television's Lucky Feller (1975–76), written by Terence Frisby and produced by Humphrey Barclay. About two brothers in south-east London, the series was in many ways a forerunner to Only Fools And Horses, only Jason was in the more dopey 'Rodney' role with Peter Armitage playing the cleverer of the two. The brothers drove around in a comical bubble car, a precursor to the famous Trotters' van; and there was even the joke where, just as he was trying to impress the girl (Cheryl Hall), Jason casually leaned back against the bar, without his knowing that barman had just lifted it behind his back, and fell through. This situation was re-enacted in Only Fools And Horses. He played the lead role of Peter Barnes in the ATV sitcom A Sharp Intake of Breath (1977–81), alongside Alun Armstrong and Richard Wilson. In 1979, he appeared as Buttons in the pantomime Cinderella at Newcastle's Theatre Royal, starring Leah Bell and Bobby Thompson, produced by Michael Grayson and directed by John Blackmore.

Children's television
In the 1980s, Jason developed a working partnership with Cosgrove Hall, and was a voice-over artist for a number of children's television productions. This included voices for Danger Mouse, The BFG, Count Duckula, Hugo from Victor and Hugo, and Toad from The Wind in the Willows, all produced by Cosgrove Hall for Thames Television/ITV. He provided the voice of Father Christmas in Father Christmas and the Missing Reindeer, Rola Polar in The Adventures of Dawdle the Donkey, Angelmouse, and did voices in animated films including Wombling Free and The Water Babies.

Transition into a leading man

In 1981, Jason found his best known role, Del Boy Trotter in the BBC situation comedy Only Fools and Horses, created by John Sullivan. Del is a wide boy who makes a dishonest living in Peckham, south London, trading in broken, stolen, and counterfeit goods. He is assisted by his brother Rodney (played by Nicholas Lyndhurst) and Grandad (played by Lennard Pearce) and, in later episodes, Uncle Albert (played by Buster Merryfield).

In 1989 Jason starred as Ted Simcock in the ITV drama series A Bit of a Do, aired from January to December.

In 1999, Jason starred as Captain Frank Beck in BBC's feature-length drama All the King's Men about the Sandringham regiment lost in World War I. He earned acclaim for a string of serious roles. These include Skullion in Porterhouse Blue (for Channel 4), Sidney "Pop" Larkin in the rural idyll The Darling Buds of May (Yorkshire Television/ITV), based on the H. E. Bates novel, which also featured Catherine Zeta-Jones.

In 1992, he signed a golden handcuffs deal with ITV to star as Detective Inspector Jack Frost in the long-running TV series A Touch of Frost (Yorkshire Television/ITV). In September 2006, he was voted by the general public as No. 1 in ITV's poll of TV's Greatest Stars.  In December 2006, he starred in Terry Pratchett's Hogfather on Sky1 as Albert. In early 2007, he starred in Diamond Geezer (Granada Television/ITV). This series ran for 3 episodes of 90 minutes each. There was a pilot in 2005. In March 2008, he starred as Rincewind in Terry Pratchett's The Colour of Magic, and in the two part ITV drama Ghostboat.

On 16 September 2008, Jason announced that he would step down from his role as Jack Frost after 16 years. Three new episodes of the show were shown in autumn 2008, and were followed by a two-part finale in 2010.  Approached by BBC1 controller Danny Cohen in early 2011, he read three scripts and agreed to shoot a pilot for The Royal Bodyguard, which was shown at the Edinburgh Film Festival. The pilot episode aired on the BBC on Boxing Day but received a poor critical response. The series was axed after six episodes. In 2010, Jason starred in a made-for-TV movie Come Rain Come Shine with Alison Steadman for ITV about an elderly Millwall supporter.

Since 2013 he has starred in Still Open All Hours. It features many original cast members (and a portrait of Ronnie Barker as Arkwright) and is still written by Roy Clarke, the original writer and creator of the show. He has also starred as Captain Skipper, a sea captain, sea dog and Pip's uncle in the animated series Pip Ahoy!.

In December 2021, Jason made a surprise cameo appearance on the Christmas Special of Strictly Come Dancing in the role of Del Boy to pass on a special message to The Repair Shop'''s Jay Blades, who was performing to the Only Fools and Horses theme tune.

Honours
In 1993, Jason was made an Officer of the Order of the British Empire (OBE), and 12 years later, in the Queen's Birthday Honours List of 2005, he was knighted for services to acting and comedy. On the day it was announced, many British newspapers used the headline "Arise Sir Del Boy" or similar, in reference to his most famous role. Upon receiving the knighthood from Queen Elizabeth II at Buckingham Palace on 1 December 2005, he said he was "humbled" by the "fantastic tribute".

Personal life
Jason lived with his long-term girlfriend, Welsh actress Myfanwy Talog, for 18 years and nursed her through breast cancer until she died in 1995. It mirrored a situation portrayed in A Touch of Frost in which the character's wife died after a long illness.

On 26 February 2001, Jason became a father for the first time at the age of 61 when his girlfriend, 41-year-old Gill Hinchcliffe, gave birth to a baby girl, Sophie Mae, born in Stoke Mandeville Hospital, Aylesbury. Jason and Hinchcliffe married in 2005 and live in Ellesborough, Buckinghamshire.

Jason is a patron of the Shark Trust, a United Kingdom registered charity working to advance the worldwide conservation of sharks through science, education, influence and action. He has also been Honorary Vice Patron of the Royal International Air Tattoo since 1999, and on 29 May 2014, presented a cheque on behalf of the Fairford-based RAF Charitable Trust for £125,000 to the British RAF Air Cadet Organisation, to fund flight simulators for Air Cadets.

Jason is a qualified helicopter pilot. In October 2013, he released his autobiography called David Jason: My Life. It was shortlisted for the 2013 Specsavers National Book Awards "Best Book of the Year". A second volume, Only Fools and Stories: From Del Boy to Granville, Pop Larkin to Frost was published in October 2017. Penguin Books announced A Del Of A Life, which is Jason's third autobiography and was published in October 2020.

In September 2017, it was reported that a "credible threat was made to his life", although it is not known why Jason had been targeted.

Works

Books

 
 
 
 

Television

Film

Animation

Radio

Awards and nominations
Jason has won a total of eighteen awards between 1986 and 2011. His hit comedy show, Only Fools and Horses won many awards. His crime drama, A Touch of Frost, has also won and been nominated numerous times. Porterhouse Blue, The Second Quest, All the King's Men and A Bit of a Do'' have won David Jason one award each.

References

External links
 
 
 TV Greats biography of David Jason – From website Television Heaven
 Interview by BBC "David Jason collects knighthood", with video
 David Jason Quits as Frost
 

1940 births
20th-century English male actors
21st-century English male actors
Actors awarded knighthoods
BAFTA fellows
BBC television producers
Best Actor BAFTA Award (television) winners
Best Comedy Performance BAFTA Award (television) winners
British male comedy actors
English autobiographers
English male radio actors
English male television actors
English male voice actors
English people of Welsh descent
English television producers
Knights Bachelor
Living people
Male actors from London
Officers of the Order of the British Empire
People from Edmonton, London